Saint-Simon is a municipality in southwestern Quebec, Canada on the Yamaska River in Les Maskoutains Regional County Municipality. The population as of the Canada 2016 Census was 1,413.

Demographics

Population

Language

Communities
Clairveaux-de-Bagot
Saint-Georges-de-Bagot
Saint-Simon-de-Bagot

See also
List of municipalities in Quebec

References

Incorporated places in Les Maskoutains Regional County Municipality
Municipalities in Quebec